Bhavam is a 2002 Indian Malayalam film, directed by Sathish Menon, starring Murali Menon and Jyothirmayi in the lead role.

Plot synopsis
Journalist Joy and his professor wife, Lata, live a comfortable if unremarkable life in coastal India. When Lata's sister, Subadra, unexpectedly arrives, the strain on Joy and Lata's troubled marriage is further exacerbated by this new development. Seemingly on the run from a murder investigation, Subadra draws Joy's attention away from Lata. Joy also struggles with his employer, who is linked to a company suspected of poisoning a water supply.

Cast
 Jyothirmayi as Lata
 Murali Menon as Joy
 Siddique	as Matthew
 Ambika Mohan as Teacher
 Irshad as Shyam
 Mita Vasisht as Subadra
 Vijayan Peringodu as MD
 Sindhu Biju as News Presenter
 Koothatukulam Leela as Kochamma
 K.M. Thomas as Krishnan Nair
 Bhavani Amma as Kalyani
 Chandrika Das as Doctor
 Johnson Manjali as Krishnanandan

Awards
Kerala State Film Award for Best Film - Sathish Menon

Kerala State Film Award for Best Debut Director - Sathish Menon

Kerala State Film Award for Second Best Actress - Jyothirmayi

Kerala State Film Award for Best Editor - B. Ajithkumar

Kerala State Film Award for Best Background Music - Isaac Thomas Kottukapally and

National Film Award – Special Jury Award - Jyothirmayi

References

External links

2002 films
2000s Malayalam-language films